The 31st Wing "Carmelo Raiti" is a unit of the Italian Air Force.

It assumed its current designation in 1936.

Mission 
It has two different institutional missions:
 VVIP transportation (highest state and military authorities).
 hospital, emergency and humanitarian flights including transportation of severely traumatized people, organs for transplantation, medical teams and equipments and public utility missions in general.

The 31st Wing is based at Rome Ciampino International Airport, 12 kilometres (7.5 mi) away from Rome.

Fleet 
The 31st Wing fleet is composed of these aircraft:
 3 aircraft  Airbus ACJ319 MM62174 - MM62209 - MM62243
 3 aircraft  Dassault Falcon 900 MM62210 - MM62244 - MM62245
 2 aircraft  Dassault Falcon 50 MM62026 - MM62029
 2 helicopters  AgustaWestland AW139 MM81806 - MM81807

An Airbus A340-541 I-TALY was leased from Etihad Airways from 2016 to 2018. It operated out of Rome Fiumicino International Airport because of runway restrictions at Ciampino.

See also 
 List of air transports of heads of state and government

References

External links 
Italian Air Force Website (English Version) 
Aircraft Records - Italian Air Force Website (English Version) 

Air force units and formations of Italy
Military units and formations established in 1936
Air force transport wings
Air transport of heads of state